Ramón Guzmán Carbonell (22 January 1907 – 1 April 1954) was a Spanish football player and manager.

Career
Born in Barcelona, Guzmán played for Barcelona between 1928 and 1935. After leaving Barcelona, he played for RCD Mallorca.

Guzmán made three appearances for the Spain national football team during 1930.

After he retired from playing, Guzmán became a football coach. He managed Barcelona during the 1941–42 season.

References

1907 births
1954 deaths
Spanish footballers
Spain international footballers
FC Barcelona players
RCD Mallorca players
La Liga players
Association football midfielders
Spanish football managers
FC Barcelona managers
Footballers from Barcelona